Justicia lanstyakii is a plant native to the Cerrado vegetation of Brazil, first described by Rizzini in 1946.

See also
 List of plants of Cerrado vegetation of Brazil

References

lanstyakii
Flora of Brazil